RV Mirabilis is a deep-sea fisheries research vessel owned by the Ministry of Fisheries and Marine Resources of Namibia.

She was built in 2012 by STX Finland Rauma shipyard in Rauma, Finland, to replace the ageing RV Welwitschia, which was gifted by Japan in 1994. The vessel was procured with the help of the Ministry for Foreign Affairs of Finland, which provided an interest free loan.

RV Mirabilis is fitted with a state of the art Raytheon Anschutz integrated bridge navigation system. The vessel maintains positioning during scientific survey work, using a Navis Engineering DP4000 dynamic positioning system.

Sources 

2012 ships
Ships of Namibia
Research vessels
Ships built in Rauma, Finland